Ringette Finland, is the national governing body for the sport of ringette in Finland and was founded in 1983. In 1986 the organization became a member of the International Ringette Federation which at the time was known as the "World Ringette Council".

Ringette Finland is also responsible for scouting ringette talent in the country in order to create the Finland national ringette teams for both Team Finland Senior and Team Finland Junior who then compete at the World Ringette Championships.

Ringette was brought to Finland in 1979 by Juhani Wahlsten and the first ringette clubs in Finland were established in Turku. Players now participate in 31 ringette clubs, with important clubs in Naantali, Turku, Uusikaupunki, Lahti, and Greater Helsinki. The first international ringette tournament was hosted in Finland in 1986 and was sponsored by Finnair.

Today, the Finnish Ringette Coaches Association is the sports association for Finnish ringette coaches.

History
In Finland the three founding fathers of ringette in the country are Juhani Wahlsten, also known as "Juuso" Wahlsten, who introduced the sport to Finland, the Finnish ringette association's first chairman, and Alpo Lindström, a ringette organizer from Naantali. A book on Ringette Finland was published on September 1, 2014, called "30 vuotta Ringeten historiaa Suomessa" (30 years of Ringette history in Finland) celebrating the organization's 30th anniversary. The book is a comprehensive account of the growth and development of Ringette in Finland, its culture, and its impact on the country's sports landscape. It features interviews with coaches, players, and other key figures associated with the sport and provides a deep dive into the history of Ringette in the country.

The first recorded ringette game in Finland took place on January 23, 1979, and became the first ringette game to be played anywhere in Europe. Finland's first ringette club was Ringetteläisiä Turun Siniset, and the country's first ringette tournament took place in December of 1980.

In 1979, the invaluable assistance of Barry Mattern, who was the President of Ringette Canada at the time, allowed him to lead a team from Winnipeg, Manitoba's, North End and introduce ringette to Finland.

Juhani Wahlsten

In 1979, Juhani "Juuso" Wahlsten introduced ringette in Finland and is considered the "Father of Ringette" in the country. In 1979 he invited two coaches, Wendy King and Evelyn Watson, from Dollard-des-Ormeaux (a suburb of Montreal Quebec, Canada) to teach girls of various ages how to play ringette. Wahlsten first introduced the new sport to a group of players in Turku during ice hockey practice, then created some ringette teams in the area.

Alpo and Jan Lindström
Alpo Lindström and his son Jan Lindström introduced Ringette to the city of Naantali towards the end of 1979, the same year Juhani Wahlsten introduced the sport to Finland for the first time. The previous year in 1978, Jan had been an exchange student in the United States where he saw girls playing ringette. Upon returning to Finland he created the VG-62 ringette club. Alpo served as chairman of the local ringette association, served as the VG-62 team coach, and sometimes as a team manager. Alpo played an important role in helping establish Finland's national ringette association in 1983 and later served as a member of the board of the International Ringette Federation.

Antti Simola
Simola served as its first chairman and was its first and longest, continuously serving, honorary chairman. Simloa was also one of the first members of the World Ringette Council (now known as the International Ringette Federation) which was formed in 1986 and became its first Vice-President.

Ringette Association of Turku
The Ringette Association of Turku was established in 1981 with several Canadian coaches going to Turku to help teach, establish and design the training, and administration for its formation. The ski national week then organized an annual tournament to bring together all the ringette teams. Its 1985 tournament included several hundred girls making it impossible to combine into a single event all the age groups and categories of players. A number of different Canadian ringette teams from Manitoba, Canada, visited in the winter of 1986 with the help of former Ringette Canada President, Barry Mattern, and helped increase the popularity of the sport in Finland.

Development

Semi-professional league

SM-Ringette was formerly known as  before it was rebranded in 2021 and is Finland's semi-professional ringette league. SM-Ringette is known generally as the "Finnish National Ringette League" by english speakers. The league is run by Ringette Finland.

The league has been in operation since the 1987–88 winter season and a number of its clubs competed in the Ringette World Club Championship while the international club tournament existed. The Agnes Jacks Trophy, named after the wife of Sam Jacks, is awarded to the league's Most Valuable Player at the end of the each season and was first awarded in 1992.

Organization
SM-Ringette (formerly ) began operating during the 1987–88 winter season. The SKRL was founded in November 2012 and started its operations at the beginning of 2013. In addition to Rinkball Finland and Ringette Finland, SKRL's founding members were the Ringette SM-referees and the Kaukalopallo SM-Liiga ry. The federations of both sports decided to combine their resources due to falling registration rates as well as for financial reasons. When the new association was founded there were about 10,000 sports enthusiasts actively involved.

At the union's fall meeting in 2019, Finland's federal government was authorized to find conditions for dissolving the union. At the spring meeting on June 6, 2020, it was decided to dissolve the Suomen Kaukalopallo- ja Ringetteliitto ry on December 31, 2020.

SM-Ringette teams

2021–22

In 2021–2022, the league entered its 34th season with nine teams playing in the championship series:

  (Kiekko-Espoo)
 Helsinki Ringette
 Tuusula Blue Rings
 Lahti Ringette
 

  (RNK Flyers)
  Ringette
 Tampere Ilves (Lynx)
  (LuKi-82)

SM Ringette season champions 1988– 

  
 1988 
 1989 
 1990 
 1991 
 1992 
 1993 Lahti Ringette
 1994 Tuusula Ringette
 1995 
 1996 Tuusula Ringette
 1997 
 1998 Tuusula Ringette
 1999 Tuusula Ringette
 2000 Tuusula Ringette
 2001 Tuusula Ringette
 2002 
 2003 
 2004 
 2005 

 2006 
 2007 
 2008 Helsinki Ringette
 2009  
 2010 
 2011 
 2012 
 2013 
 2014 
 2015 
 2016 
 2017 
 2018 
 2019  
 2020 
 2021 
 2022

National teams 

The Finnish national ringette team includes two separate teams: Team Finland Senior and Team Finland Junior. Both teams compete in the World Ringette Championships.

See also
Ringette
Ringette Canada
Sweden Ringette Association
Juhani Wahlsten
 Antero Kivelä
International Ringette Federation
National Ringette League (Canada)

References

External links 
   Ringette Finland History (archived)
   Turku Ringette History
   Walapais Archives

Sports governing bodies in Finland
Ringette
Women's team sports
History of women's sports
Semi-professional sports
Semi-professional sports leagues